Lapine  is an unincorporated community in Montgomery and Crenshaw counties in the U.S. state of Alabama. Lapine has a post office with ZIP code 36046, which opened on July 12, 1887.

Notable person
Ed Stroud, former professional baseball outfielder

References

Unincorporated communities in Crenshaw County, Alabama
Unincorporated communities in Montgomery County, Alabama
Unincorporated communities in Alabama